Tserkhimakhi (Dargwa: Цергимахьи) is a rural locality (a selo) in Akushinsky Selsoviet, Akushinsky District, Republic of Dagestan, Russia. The population was 492 as of 2010. There are 39 streets.

Geography
Tserkhimakhi is located near Akusha (the district's administrative centre) by road.

References 

Rural localities in Akushinsky District